Blue Men, or The Blue Men, may refer to:

 The Blue Men (Playhouse 90), a 1959 television play directed by John Frankenheimer
 Blue men of the Minch, mythological creatures also known as storm kelpies
 "Blue Men" of the Sahara, name used by early visitors to describe the men of the Tuareg people
 The Blue Men, performers of Joe Meek's 1960 album I Hear a New World

See also
 Blue Man Group, U.S.-American performance art company
 Men in blue, nickname given to the India national cricket team